Franklin Creek may refer to:

Franklin Creek (South Dakota), a stream
Franklin Creek State Park, a state park in Illinois